Cheshmeh Ali (also Romanized as Cheshmeh ‘Alī and Cheshmeh-ye ‘Alī) is a village in Fariman Rural District, in the Central District of Fariman County, Razavi Khorasan Province, Iran. At the 2006 census, its population was 28, in 6 families.

References 

Populated places in Fariman County